The Baloch Republican Students Organization (Urdu: بلوچ ریپبلکن اسٹوڈنٹس آرگنائزیشن) is a prominent student and political organization that campaigns for the ethnic Baloch students in Pakistan's Balochistan province and other Baloch dominated areas in Pakistan. It was formed in 2008 after broke away from the Watan Students Federation, originally formed by Akbar Bugti.The first council session of the organization was held in 2009 in Balochistan University, Quetta.
The BRSO is student wing of Baloch Republican Party headed by Brahumdagh Bugti.

References

 Baloch political parties have recorded worldwide protest on human rights day.
 BRSO activists protest against killings in Dera Bugti.

External links
 Third national council session of Baloch Republican Students Organization held in Paroom.
 In Berlin: Baloch Republican Students Organization raises voice against the human rights violations in Balochistan.
 Student activists in Berlin protest Pakistan's atrocities in Balochistan

Baloch nationalist organizations